Saverton is an unincorporated community in eastern Ralls County, Missouri, United States. It is located on the Mississippi River, approximately ten miles southeast of Hannibal. Saverton is part of the Hannibal Micropolitan Statistical Area.

Saverton was founded in 1819 and is named after the local Saverton family, who were likely prominent in the area. A post office called Saverton has been in operation since 1832.

Saverton School was listed on the National Register of Historic Places in 1998.

Demographics

References

Unincorporated communities in Ralls County, Missouri
Hannibal, Missouri micropolitan area
Populated places established in 1819
Unincorporated communities in Missouri